Carl Friedrich von Ledebour (8 July 1786, Stralsund – 4 July 1851, Munich; also Karl Friedrich von Ledebour) was a German-Estonian botanist.

Between 1811 and 1836, he was professor of science in the University of Tartu, Estonia. 

His most important works were Flora Altaica, the first Flora of the Altay Mountains, published in 1833, and Flora Rossica, published in four volumes between 1841–1853, the first complete flora of the Russian Empire. 

New species he described for the first time in the Flora Altaica include Malus sieversii (as Pyrus sieversii), the wild ancestor of the apple, and the Siberian Larch (Larix sibirica).

The plant genera Ledebouria (in the Asparagus family, Asparagaceae), and Ledebouriella (from the family Apiaceae) are named in his honor.

Personal life
Ledebour was the son of the Swedish military Johann Ledebour and his mother was Anna Maria Hagemann.

See also
 List of Baltic German scientists

External links
Vascular Plant Flora of Estonia Summary Includes biographical details.

References 

19th-century German botanists
Corresponding members of the Saint Petersburg Academy of Sciences
1786 births
1851 deaths
People from Stralsund
Academic staff of the University of Tartu
German people of Swedish descent